The Storehouse Island, part of the Babel Group within the Furneaux Group, is a  unpopulated granite island, located in Bass Strait, lying off the east coast of Flinders Island, Tasmania, south of Victoria, in south-eastern Australia.

The Storehouse Island forms part of the Babel Island Group Important Bird Area.

Fauna
Seabirds and waders recorded as breeding on the island include little penguin, short-tailed shearwater, silver gull, Pacific gull and sooty oystercatcher.  Resident reptiles include metallic skink and tiger snake.  The rakali is thought to visit the island.

See also

 List of islands of Tasmania

References

Furneaux Group
Protected areas of Tasmania
Important Bird Areas of Tasmania
Islands of North East Tasmania
Islands of Bass Strait